Entacmaea is a genus of sea anemone in the family Actiniidae.

Species
The following species are recognized in the genus Entacmaea:
 Entacmaea medusivora Fautin & Fitt, 1991
 Entacmaea quadricolor (Leuckart in Rüppell & Leuckart, 1828)

References

Actiniidae
Hexacorallia genera